The Andhra Pradesh Legislative Council or Andhra Pradesh Śāsana Manḍali is the upper house of the bicameral legislature of the Indian state, Andhra Pradesh. 

It is situated in the state Legislative capital of Amaravati comprising a total of 58 seats. The Sasana Mandali has been in existence in two spells - from 1958 to 1985, and from 2007 continuing till today.

History
In the first years since its creation in post-independence India, the state of Andhra Pradesh worked under a unicameral parliamentary system. On 5 December 1956, the Andhra Pradesh Vidhana Sabha passed a resolution calling for the creation of an upper house, the Vidhan Parishad, to transition to a bicameral system. The members of the majority party/coalition in the lower house would be the ruling party of the upper house, regardless of number. The house will have a chairman who conducts day-to-day affairs, rather than a speaker. The Vidhan Parishad was formed officially on 1 July 1958 under article 168 of the Constitution of India. The first President of India, Dr. Rajendra Prasad inaugurated the Vidhan Parishad on 8 July 1958.

Abolition in 1980 
In the 1980s, Andhra Pradesh became one of the first states to seek the abolition of the upper houses, which were being increasingly criticised as being unnecessary, unrepresentative of the population, a burden on the state budget and causing delays in passing legislation. However, the move was criticised by the opposition's as an attempt by the then-ruling party, the Telugu Desam Party (TDP), to deny their main political opposition, the Indian National Congress (I) of influence in the state government and the control of the upper house, which could delay TDP-sponsored legislation and where the TDP held no seats. In accordance with a resolution passed by the Andhra Pradesh Vidhan Sabha, the Indian Parliament abolished the Vidhan Parishad through the Andhra Pradesh Legislative Council (Abolition) Act in 1985, after the Congress (I) suffered a major defeat in the state elections in Andhra Pradesh.

Revival in 2007
Subsequent attempts were made to revive the Legislative Council under Chief Minister Dr. Marri Chenna Reddy, who belonged to the Congress (I), which had won the state elections in 1989. A resolution to revive the Legislative Council was passed in the Vidhan Sabha on 22 January 1990. The Rajya Sabha, the upper house of the Indian Parliament, passed legislation authorising the revival of the Legislative Council as per the resolution of the state Vidhan Sabha on 28 May 1990, but the legislation stalled in the lower house, the Lok Sabha, primarily due to its dissolution in 1991 before the completion of its five-year term. The subsequent Lok Sabhas did not take any further decision or action.

After its victory in the 2004 state elections, the Congress-led Andhra Pradesh Legislative Assembly passed another resolution on 8 July 2004 calling for the revival of the Legislative Council. This time it was introduced in the Lok Sabha as the Andhra Pradesh Council Bill on 16 December 2004. On 15 December 2006 the Lok Sabha passed the legislation, which was quickly passed by the Rajya Sabha on 20 December, and received the assent of the President on 10 January 2007. The newly revived Legislative Council was constituted on 30 March 2007 and inaugurated on 2 April by Rameshwar Thakur, the Governor of Andhra Pradesh.

Second abolition proposed in 2020 
The ruling YSR Congress Party made and passed the resolution for abolition of the Legislative Council in Andhra Pradesh Legislative Assembly on  27 Jan 2020 to make way for the YSRCP-sponsered Capital decentralisation bill which has been stalled by the opposition TDP which had majority in the council citing that the bills have been sent to a select committee instead of the ordinance route.The resolution was later withdrawn as the ruling YSRCP gained a majority in the council making a way to pass it's sponsered bills and with no response from the Parliament of India regarding the decision to abolish the council.

Composition 
The chairman, elected by the council, presides over the sessions of the council. The deputy chairman is also elected to preside in the chairman's absence.

Presiding officers

Members

Membership and tenure
The Legislative Council is a permanent house, not subject to dissolution. Its 58 members serve six-year terms, and every two years, one-third of the total number of members "retire" in rotation, and undergo the re-election process. To become a member, the individual must be a citizen of India and at least 30 years of age. 8 members of the council are nominated by the Governor of Andhra Pradesh. 40 members are elected by an electoral college of the Legislative Assembly and local governing bodies. The 10 remaining members would be elected from constituencies of college graduates and teachers.

Elected by Members of Legislative Assembly (20)
Keys:

Elected from Local Authorities' constituencies (20)
Keys:

Elected from Graduates' constituencies (5)
Keys:

Elected from Teachers' constituencies (5)
Keys:

Nominated by Governor (8)
Keys:

See also
Elections in Andhra Pradesh
List of chairpersons of the Andhra Pradesh Legislative Council

References

 
1958 establishments in Andhra Pradesh